The Bogoda Wooden Bridge was built in the 16th century during the Dambadeniya era. This is said to be the oldest surviving wooden bridge in Sri Lanka. All parts of this bridge were constructed from wood, including the use of wooden nails as fixing material. The roof tiles show the influence of Kingdom of Kandy. The bridge was built across the Gallanda Oya, which linked Badulla and Kandy on an ancient route.

Description
The Bogoda bridge is over 400 years old and made entirely from wooden planks, which are said to have come from one tree. Wooden fences of the bridge are decorated in various ancient designs and have been erected on either sides.

The structure of the bridge is standing on a huge tree trunk  in height. Jack fruit (Artocarpus heterophyllus) logs and Kumbuk (Terminalia arjuna) logs were mainly used as the constructive material of the bridge. Furthermore, Kaluwara (Diospyros ebenum) timber and Milla timber were used for the wooden decorations.

Bogoda Temple
The Bogoda Buddhist temple is an ancient temple situated beside the Bogoda Wooden Bridge. The temple has a much longer history than the bridge. It is from the 1st century BC, during the period of the Anuradhapura era. The temple was built per the instructions of King Valagamba. The stone inscription by the temple, in Brahmin scripture, says the temple was donated to a priest called Brahmadatta by Tissa, a provincial leader in Badulla.

Inside of the temple were elaborate lovely paintings, bearing resemblance to the Kandyan era. The walls were built with a paste made of cotton wool, bee honey and extracted and purified white clay. The paintings were painted on this walls.

On 27 May 2011 Sri Lanka Post issued a Rs. 15 stamp with a photograph of the bridge, as part of a set of stamps commemorating bridges and culverts in Sri Lanka.

References

External links
Bogoda Roofed Bridge

Archaeological protected monuments in Badulla District
Bridges in Badulla District
Buddhist pilgrimage sites in Sri Lanka
Kingdom of Kandy
Tourist attractions in Badulla District
Wooden bridges